Arapeta Marukitepua Pitapitanuiarangi Awatere  (25 April 1910 – 6 March 1976) was a New Zealand interpreter, military leader, maori welfare officer, and local politician. Of Māori descent, he identified with the Ngati Hine (Northland), Ngati Porou and Te Whanau-a-Hinetapora iwi. He was born in Tuparoa, East Coast, on 25 April 1910. He served as a colonel in the Māori battalion during the Second World War and is father to the former MP Donna Awatere Huata.

In 1969 he stabbed to death his girlfriend's new lover, which he unsuccessfully tried to blame on diabetes induced psychosis, and was later convicted and sentenced to life in prison, where he died unexpectedly seven years later.

References

1910 births
1976 deaths
 New Zealand Companions of the Distinguished Service Order
Interpreters
 New Zealand Army officers
 New Zealand military personnel of World War II
 New Zealand people convicted of murder
Local politicians in New Zealand
Ngāti Hine people
Ngāti Porou people
 People convicted of murder by New Zealand
New Zealand recipients of the Military Cross
20th-century translators
20th-century New Zealand politicians
 Auckland City Councillors
 New Zealand Māori soldiers
 New Zealand politicians convicted of crimes
New Zealand sportsperson-politicians
New Zealand people who died in prison custody